Rugapedia is a genus of minute operculate snails, marine gastropod mollusks or micromollusks in the family Assimineidae.

Species
Species within the genus Rugapedia include:

 Rugapedia androgyna Fukuda & Ponder, 2004

References

External links

Assimineidae
Monotypic gastropod genera